Acid Jazz Records is a record label based in East London formed by Gilles Peterson and Eddie Piller in 1987. The label is the namesake of the acid-jazz subgenre of jazz music for which it is most famously known for producing.

Background
The label's first signing was singer-songwriter Rob Gallagher's band, Galliano, which released the label's first single "Frederick Lies Still" in 1987, which features a sample of "Freddie's Dead" by Curtis Mayfield. The label was known in its early days for putting on club nights at Camden's Dingwalls featuring artists such as The Night Trains and A Man Called Adam.

In 1989 after Peterson left in order to create his own label Talkin' Loud, Acid Jazz signed a second wave of artists including the Brand New Heavies, who released their self-titled debut album in 1990, Corduroy, Mother Earth, and Jamiroquai, who released their debut single "When You Gonna Learn" on the label in 1992.

Throughout the 1990s the label also put out a number of compilation albums, most notably the Totally Wired series which covered the range of influences and sounds within the acid-jazz genre, as well as what was being released on the label at that time.

In 1993, Piller, the label's owner purchased a night-club which he named the Blue Note. Initially used as a way of promoting the record label's music, the club soon built up a large reputation and was open seven nights a week hosting various different club nights including that of musician Goldie's Metalheadz label.

After the closing of the Blue Note in the late 1990s the label somewhat shifted its focus from producing just acid-jazz and its similar genres of music to that of soul and mod. The mid-2000s saw the signing of Andy Lewis and the release of his top 40 Northern Soul inspired single "Are You Trying To Be Lonely?" featuring Paul Weller on vocals. The label also released the "Rare Mod" series, a collection of rare 7" vinyl EPs from the 60's, presented in a picture sleeves, as well as accompanying compilation albums.

In the last decade the label has celebrated its 25th anniversary and re-issued a number of its best-selling records such as The Brand New Heavies and The People Tree, as well as putting out a special 6-CD boxset including an artwork book and DVD. This period has also seen the label sign more contemporary soul artists such as New Street Adventure and Men of North Country, as well as the folk-rock of British actor Matt Berry.

In 2017 the label issued a previously unreleased single by soul-singer Leroy Hutson, "Positive Forces", as well as releasing an Anthology of his work. In 2018 they re-issued his two most popular albums Hutson and Hutson II and produced a short four-part online documentary about him, titled "Leroy Hutson: The Man!" As part of their 30th anniversary celebrations they are set to release a jazz compilation "Jazz on the Corner" featuring song choices by Eddie Piller and his friend Martin Freeman, while Corduroy released their first album in 18 years entitled "Return of the Fabric Four".

Staff
 Eddie Piller - Founder, Chairman
 Gilles Peterson - Founder
 Trevor Randall - Vice president

Roster

 Akimbo
 Andy Bennett
 Matt Berry
 The Brand New Heavies
 The Broken Vinyl Club
 Tony Christie
 Corduroy
 Clem Curtis
 Graham Dee
 Detroit City Council
 Dexters
 The Dilemmas
 DJ Naked
 Carl Douglas
 The Elements
 Emperors New Clothes
 Erobique
 Chris Farlowe
 The Filthy Six
 The Fleur De Lys
 The Frays
 Geno Washington & The Ram Jam Band
 Goldbug
 Grand Union
 Humble Souls
 Jarvis Humby
 Leroy Hutson
 Gregory Isaacs
 The James Taylor Quartet
 Jamiroquai
 Janice Graham Band
 Jarvis Humby
 Jimmy James and the Vagabonds
 John's Children
 Jasmine Kara
 Jinrai
 Kenny Bernard & The Wranglers
 Le Leo
 Lord Large
 Andy Lewis
 Freddy Mack
 Manasseh Meets The Equalizer
 A Man Called Adam
 Men of North Country
 Mister Exe
 The Moons
 Mark Morriss (of The Bluetones)
 Mother Earth
 New Street Adventure
 Night Trains
 The Ossie Layne Show
 Parlour Talk
 Dean Parrish
 Pleasurebeach
 The Apostles
 The Red Inspectors
 The Richard Kent Style
 The Sandals
 Satisfaction
 Skunkhour
 Smoove
 Snowboy
 Speak Low
 The Stabilisers
 Sharon Tandy
 The Third Degree
 Tito Lopez Combo
 Tony and Tandy
 Twisted Tongue
 Paul Weller
 Benjamin Zephaniah

Totally Wired Radio
Totally Wired Radio was set up by Acid Jazz Records in 2019 as an extension of their original series of Totally Wired compilations compiled by Eddie Piller and  Gilles Peterson. As well as playing the kind of sounds Acid Jazz Records and Piller are generally known for (when compiling compilations such as Eddie Piller presents British Mod Sounds of The 1960s) the stations output also includes country music, library music, reggae, film soundtracks, EDM, Afrobeat, Latin, punk, psyche and disco.

References

External links
  – official site
 
 BBC Radio 1 biography, Gilles Peterson at BBC

Record labels based in London
Jazz record labels
Record labels established in 1987